Mandy Clark (born June 9, 1982) is an American voice actress, primarily noted for her role as Tomo Takino in the English-language dub of Azumanga Daioh. She auditioned for ADV Films in the year 2000 without prior drama training, and landed her first episode role in Excel Saga. She retired from voice acting in 2004 in order to begin attending college. In early 2006 she returned to Houston and has since graduated. She is currently working as a freelance digital artist. She was married in 2009.

Notable roles 

 Arisu Fujisaki in Angelic Layer
 Tomo Takino in Azumanga Daioh
 Mizuki Inaba in Full Metal Panic!
 Cosette Sara and Anne Anzai in Excel Saga
 Erukarena in Orphen (Season 2: Revenge)
 Kirara Mitsuboshi in Najica Blitz Tactics
 Pen-Pen in Neon Genesis Evangelion (Director's Cut)
 Mawata Awayuki in Pretear
 Potée in the Sorcerer Hunters OVA
 Reika Mishima in RahXephon
 Meihou and Donghua in Saiyuki
 Mayuko Inoue in Ushio & Tora
 Sister Anna in Chrono Crusade (Ep. 1–15)

Minor roles 

 Ghost Cat in Panyo Panyo Di Gi Charat
 Madonna in Megazone 23
 Nao in Chance Pop Session
 Fifi in Princess Nine

References

External links 
 
 

1982 births
American voice actresses
Living people
Actresses from Houston
21st-century American women